The Lake Blackshear Regional Library System (LBRLS) is a public library system covering the four counties of Sumter, Crisp, Dooly, Schley, Georgia, United States. The Lake Blackshear Headquarters Library is located in Americus. The system is also home to the second oldest Carnegie library in Georgia, located in Cordele.

LBRLS is a member of PINES, a program of the Georgia Public Library Service that covers 53 library systems in 143 counties of Georgia. Any resident in a PINES supported library system has access to the system's collection of 10.6 million books. The library is also serviced by GALILEO, a program of the University System of Georgia which stands for "GeorgiA LIbrary LEarning Online". This program offers residents in supported libraries access to over 100 databases indexing thousands of periodicals and scholarly journals. It also boasts over 10,000 journal titles in full text.

Carnegie libraries

Cordele Carnegie
The Lake Blackshear Regional Library System is home to the second oldest Carnegie library in the state of Georgia. The building was constructed via a $17,550 grant from Andrew Carnegie in 1903 and was dedicated the following year. As with all Carnegie libraries in the United States, the Carnegie Foundation dissociated itself from the building after funding was provided. Thus further requests for more money were often denied outright. The Cordele Carnegie library is one of the few buildings in the country which reversed this trend and received a second fund, albeit at a lower amount than originally requested and only after the head of the Georgia Library Commission herself petitioned the Carnegia Foundation. Explaining that the library was not large enough to hold the collection, an additional grant of $7,556 was given to the county to renovate and expand the building.

Americus Carnegie
The Americus chapter of the Daughters of the Revolution similarly petitioned Carnegie in 1908 for funds to construct their own public library. The town was gifted $20,000, considerably more than many other grants throughout the country, and with this money designed a two-story building with an auditorium on the top floor. The Daughters additionally hosted many events, including a masquerade ball, in order to raise funding for books for the new library. The auditorium was the cause of some contention between the Carnegie Foundation and the designers of the building, but Carnegie agreed to include it in the building plans after previous libraries were shown to have auditoriums included in their plans. The collection was eventually moved out of the library when the new regional headquarters was built and now exists as a commercial business.

Branches
In 2008 the system joined up with PINES, a state-wide border free library that shares its circulation among most of the library systems in Georgia.

Library systems in neighboring counties
Middle Georgia Regional Library System to the north
Houston County Public Library System to the northeast
Ocmulgee Regional Library System to the east
Coastal Plain Regional Library System to the southeast
Worth County Library System to the south
Lee County Library to the south
Kinchafoonee Regional Library System to the southwest
Chattahoochee Valley Libraries to the west
Pine Mountain Regional Library System to the northwest

References

External links
PINES catalog

County library systems in Georgia (U.S. state)
Public libraries in Georgia (U.S. state)